Peter Levenda is an American author who focuses primarily on occult history. He is best known for his book Unholy Alliance, which is about Esoteric Hitlerism and Nazi occultism.

Occultist Alan Cabal wrote in 2003 that Levenda was the writer with the pseudonym of "Simon", the author of the Simon Necronomicon, a grimoire that derives its title from H. P. Lovecraft's fictional Necronomicon, featured in Lovecraft's Cthulhu Mythos stories. The United States Copyright Office registration for Simon's Gates of the Necronomicon lists the author as Peter Levenda, whose pseudonym is Simon. Levenda told in some interviews that he was not "Simon".

Written works
Unholy Alliance: A History of Nazi Involvement With the Occult (1994). .
Dead Names: The Dark History of the Necronomicon (2005). .
 Sinister Forces - The Nine: A Grimoire of American Political Witchcraft (Sinister Forces) (2005) 
Sinister Forces - A Warm Gun: A Grimoire of American Political Witchcraft (Sinister Forces) (2005)
Allianza Malefica / Unholy Alliance: The Nazis and the Power of the Occult (2006)
Sinister Forces - The Manson Secret: A Grimoire of American Political Witchcraft (Sinister Forces) (2006)
Gates of the Necronomicon (as Simon) (2006)
The Mao of Business: Guerrilla Trade Techniques for the New China (2007)
Stairway to Heaven: Chinese Alchemists, Jewish Kabbalists, and the Art of Spiritual Transformation (2008)
The Secret Temple: Masons, Mysteries and the Founding of America (2009)
Tantric Temples: Eros and Magic in Java (2011)
Ratline: Soviet Spies, Nazi Priests, and the Disappearance of Adolf Hitler. Lake Worth, Fl.: IBIS Press]l (2012).
The Angel And The Sorcerer (2012)
The Dark Lord: H. P. Lovecraft, Kenneth Grant, and the Typhonian Tradition in Magic (2013)
The Hitler Legacy: The Nazi Cult in Diaspora, How it was Organized, How it was Funded, and Why it Remains a Threat to Global Security in the Age of Terrorism (2014)
The Tantric Alchemist:  Thomas Vaughan and the Indian Tantric Tradition (2015)
The Lovecraft Code (2016)
Sekret Machines: Gods (with Tom DeLonge) (2017)
Dunwich (2018)
Starry Wisdom (2019)
Sekret Machines: Man (with Tom DeLonge) (2019)
Unholy Alliance: A History of Nazi Involvement with the Occult, New and Expanded Edition (2019)
''Rites of the Mummy: The K'rla Cell and the Secret Key to Liber AL" with Jeffrey D. Evans (2021)

References

External links

Ortronics to set up local office (archive), New Straits Times, Feb 12, 1988
 
Ratline website
Tantric Temples website
 Thelema Now! Interview with Peter Levenda: http://traffic.libsyn.com/wuelf2000/Thelema_Now_Peter_Levenda.mp3

American occult writers
Living people
21st-century American historians
21st-century American male writers
1950 births
American male non-fiction writers